Choi Hwan-hwan is a female former international table tennis player from South Korea.

Early life
Choi's parents were both table tennis players. She attended  in Seoul.

Table tennis career
She won a bronze medal at the 1969 World Table Tennis Championships in the women's doubles with Choi Jung-sook.  

She played in the 1968 Asian Championships as a 17 year old.

See also
 List of table tennis players
 List of World Table Tennis Championships medalists

References

South Korean female table tennis players
1951 births
Living people
World Table Tennis Championships medalists